Jörg Schmidt (16 February 1961 – 21 July 2022) was an East German sprint canoer who competed in the 1980s. He won a silver medal in the C-1 1000 m event at the 1988 Summer Olympics in Seoul. He was born in Berlin, East Germany.

Schmidt also won a gold medal in the C-1 1000 m event at the 1982 ICF Canoe Sprint World Championships in Belgrade.

He married Birgit Fischer, who would win 12 Summer Olympic medals in women's sprint canoeing between 1980 and 2004. Their marriage lasted from 1984 to 1993 and gave them a child in 1986. Schmidt's niece Fanny won a gold medal in the K-4 500 m event at the 2008 Summer Olympics in Beijing.

References 

 DatabaseOlympics.com profile
 
 
 
 Wallechinsky, David and Jaime Loucky (2008). "Canoeing: Women's Kayak Singles 500 Meters". In The Complete Book of the Olympics: 2008 Edition. London: Aurum Press Limited. pp. 491–2.

External links

1961 births
2022 deaths
Canoeists from Berlin
East German male canoeists
Canoeists at the 1988 Summer Olympics
Olympic canoeists of East Germany
Olympic silver medalists for East Germany
Olympic medalists in canoeing
ICF Canoe Sprint World Championships medalists in Canadian
Medalists at the 1988 Summer Olympics